Chinese classic texts or canonical texts or simply dianji (典籍) refers to the Chinese texts which originated before the imperial unification by the Qin dynasty in 221 BC, particularly the "Four Books and Five Classics" of the Neo-Confucian tradition, themselves a customary abridgment of the "Thirteen Classics". All of these pre-Qin texts were written in classical Chinese. All three canons are collectively known as the classics (t , s , jīng, lit. "warp").

The term Chinese classic texts may be broadly used in reference to texts which were written in vernacular Chinese or it may be narrowly used in reference to texts which were written in the classical Chinese which was current until the fall of the last imperial dynasty, the Qing, in 1912. These texts can include shi (historical works), zi (philosophical works belonging to schools of thought other than the Confucian but also including works on agriculture, medicine, mathematics, astronomy, divination, art criticism, and other miscellaneous writings) and ji (literary works) as well as jing (Chinese medicine).

In the Ming and Qing dynasties, the Four Books and Five Classics were the subjects of mandatory study by those Confucian scholars who wished to take the imperial exams and needed to pass them in order to become government officials. Any political discussion was full of references to this background, and one could not be one of the literati (or, in some periods, even a military officer) without having memorized them. Generally, children first memorized the Chinese characters of the "Three Character Classic" and the "Hundred Family Surnames" and they then went on to memorize the other classics. The literate elite therefore shared a common culture and set of values.

Qin dynasty

Loss of texts at the end of the Qin dynasty
According to Sima Qian's Records of the Grand Historian (Shiji), after Qin Shi Huangdi, the first emperor of China, unified China in 221 BC, his chancellor Li Si suggested suppressing intellectual discourse to unify thought and political opinion. This was alleged to have destroyed philosophical treatises of the Hundred Schools of Thought, with the goal of strengthening the official Qin governing philosophy of Legalism. Three categories of books were viewed by Li Si to be most dangerous politically. These were poetry, history (especially historical records of other states than Qin), and philosophy. The ancient collection of poetry and historical records contained many stories concerning the ancient virtuous rulers. Li Si believed that if the people were to read these works they were likely to invoke the past and become dissatisfied with the present. The reason for opposing various schools of philosophy was that they advocated political ideas often incompatible with the totalitarian regime.

Modern historians doubt the details of the story, which first appeared more than a century later in the Han dynasty official Sima Qian's Records of the Grand Historian. Michael Nylan observes that despite its mythic significance, the Burning of the Books legend does not bear close scrutiny. Nylan suggests that the reason Han dynasty scholars charged the Qin with destroying the Confucian Five Classics was partly to "slander" the state they defeated and partly because Han scholars misunderstood the nature of the texts, for it was only after the founding of the Han that Sima Qian labeled the Five Classics as "Confucian". Nylan also points out that the Qin court appointed classical scholars who were specialists on the Classic of Poetry and the Book of Documents, which meant that these texts would have been exempted, and that the Book of Rites and the Zuozhuan did not contain the glorification of defeated feudal states which the First Emperor gave as his reason for destroying them. Nylan further suggests that the story might be based on the fact that the Qin palace was razed in 207 BCE and many books were undoubtedly lost at that time. Martin Kern adds that Qin and early Han writings frequently cite the Classics, especially the Documents and the Classic of Poetry, which would not have been possible if they had been burned, as reported.

Western Han dynasty

Five Classics
The Five Classics are five pre-Qin Chinese books that became part of the state-sponsored curriculum during the Western Han dynasty, which adopted Confucianism as its official ideology. It was during this period that the texts first began to be considered together as a set collection, and to be called collectively the "Five Classics". Several of the texts were already prominent by the Warring States period. Mencius, the leading Confucian scholar of the time, regarded the Spring and Autumn Annals as being equally important as the semi-legendary chronicles of earlier periods.

Classic of Poetry
A collection of 305 poems divided into 160 folk songs, 105 festal songs sung at court ceremonies, and 40 hymns and eulogies sung at sacrifices to heroes and ancestral spirits of the royal house. 
Book of Documents
A collection of documents and speeches alleged to have been written by rulers and officials of the early Zhou period and before. It is possibly the oldest Chinese narrative, and may date from the 6th century BC. It includes examples of early Chinese prose.
Book of Rites
Describes ancient rites, social forms and court ceremonies. The version studied today is a re-worked version compiled by scholars in the third century BC rather than the original text, which is said to have been edited by Confucius himself. 
I Ching (Book of Changes)
The book contains a divination system comparable to Western geomancy or the West African Ifá system. In Western cultures and modern East Asia, it is still widely used for this purpose.
Spring and Autumn Annals
A historical record of the State of Lu, Confucius's native state, 722–481 BC.

Up to the Western Han, authors would typically list the Classics in the order Poems-Documents-Rituals-Changes-Spring and Autumn. However, from the Eastern Han the default order instead became Changes-Documents-Poems-Rituals-Spring and Autumn.

Han Imperial Library

In 26 BCE, at the command of the emperor, Liu Xiang (77–6BC) compiled the first catalogue of the imperial library, the Abstracts   Bielu), and is the first known editor of the Classic of Mountains and Seas (Shanhaijing), which was finished by his son. Liu also edited collections of stories and biographies, the Biographies of Exemplary Women (Lienüzhuan). He has long erroneously been credited with compiling the Biographies of the Immortals (Liexian Zhuan), a collection of Taoist hagiographies and hymns. Liu Xiang was also a poet - he is credited with the "Nine Laments" ("Jiu Tan") that appears in the anthology Chu Ci'.

The works edited and compiled by Liu Xiang include:

This work was continued by his son, Liu Xin (scholar), who finally completed the task after his father's death.

Song dynasty

Four Books 

The Four Books are Chinese classic texts illustrating the core value and belief systems in Confucianism. They were selected by Zhu Xi in the Song dynasty to serve as general introduction to Confucian thought, and they were, in the Ming and Qing dynasties, made the core of the official curriculum for the civil service examinations.
They are:

 Great Learning
 Originally one chapter in the Book of Rites. It consists of a short main text attributed to Confucius and nine commentary chapters by Zengzi, one of the disciples of Confucius. Its importance is illustrated by Zengzi's foreword that this is the gateway of learning. It is significant because it expresses many themes of Chinese philosophy and political thinking, and has therefore been extremely influential both in classical and modern Chinese thought. Government, self-cultivation and investigation of things are linked.

 Doctrine of the Mean
 Another chapter in Book of Rites, attributed to Confucius' grandson Zisi. The purpose of this small, 33-chapter book is to demonstrate the usefulness of a golden way to gain perfect virtue. It focuses on the Way (道) that is prescribed by a heavenly mandate not only to the ruler but to everyone. To follow these heavenly instructions by learning and teaching will automatically result in a Confucian virtue. Because Heaven has laid down what is the way to perfect virtue, it is not that difficult to follow the steps of the holy rulers of old if one only knows what is the right way.

 Analects
 A compilation of speeches by Confucius and his disciples, as well as the discussions they held. Since Confucius's time, the Analects has heavily influenced the philosophy and moral values of China and later other East Asian countries as well. The Imperial examinations, started in the Sui dynasty and eventually abolished with the founding of the Republic of China, emphasized Confucian studies and expected candidates to quote and apply the words of Confucius in their essays.

 Mencius
 A collection of conversations of the scholar Mencius with kings of his time. In contrast to the sayings of Confucius, which are short and self-contained, the Mencius consists of long dialogues with extensive prose.

Ming dynasty

Thirteen Classics
The official curriculum of the imperial examination system from the Song dynasty onward are the Thirteen Classics. In total, these works total to more than 600,000 characters that must be memorized in order to pass the examination. Moreover, these works are accompanied by extensive commentary and annotation, containing approximately 300 million characters by some estimates.

 Classic of Changes or I Ching (易經 Yìjīng)
 Book of Documents (書經 Shūjīng)
 Classic of Poetry (詩經 Shījīng)
 The Three Ritual Classics (三禮 Sānlǐ)
 Rites of Zhou (周禮 Zhōulǐ)
 Ceremonies and Rites (儀禮 Yílǐ)
 Book of Rites (禮記 Lǐjì)
 "Great Learning" chapter (大學 "Dà Xué")
 "Doctrine of the Mean" chapter (中庸 "Zhōng Yōng")
 The Three Commentaries on the Spring and Autumn Annals
 The Commentary of Zuo (左傳 Zuǒzhuàn)
 The Commentary of Gongyang (公羊傳 Gōngyáng Zhuàn)
 The Commentary of Guliang (穀梁傳 Gǔliáng Zhuàn)
 The Analects (論語 Lúnyǔ)
 Classic of Filial Piety (孝經 Xiàojīng)
 Erya (爾雅 Ěryǎ)
 Mencius (孟子 Mèngzǐ)

List of Classics

Before 221 BC
It is often difficult or impossible to precisely date pre-Qin works beyond their being "pre-Qin", a period of 1000 years. Information in ancient China was often orally passed down for generations before it was written down, so the order of the composition of the texts may not be in the same order as that which was arranged by their attributed "authors".

The below list is therefore organized in the order which is found in the Siku Quanshu, the imperial library of the Qing dynasty. The Siku classifies all works into 4 top-level branches: the Confucian Classics and their secondary literature; history; philosophy; and poetry. There are sub-categories within each branch, but due to the small number of pre-Qin works in the Classics, History and Poetry branches, the sub-categories are only reproduced for the Philosophy branch.

Classics branch

History branch

Philosophy branch

Poetry

After 206 BC
 The Twenty-Four Histories, a collection of authoritative histories of China for various dynasties:
 The Records of the Grand Historian by Sima Qian 
 The Book of Han by Ban Gu.
 The Book of Later Han by Fan Ye
 The Records of Three Kingdoms by Chen Shou
 The Book of Jin by Fang Xuanling
 The Book of Song by Shen Yue
 The Book of Southern Qi by Xiao Zixian
 The Book of Liang by Yao Silian
 The Book of Chen by Yao Silian
 The History of the Southern Dynasties by Li Yanshou
 The Book of Wei by Wei Shou
 The Book of Zhou by Linghu Defen
 The Book of Northern Qi by Li Baiyao
 The History of the Northern Dynasties by Li Yanshou
 The Book of Sui by Wei Zheng
 The Old Book of Tang by Liu Xu
 The New Book of Tang by Ouyang Xiu
 The Old History of Five Dynasties by Xue Juzheng
 The New History of Five Dynasties by Ouyang Xiu
 The History of Song by Toqto'a
 The History of Liao by Toqto'a
 The History of Jin by Toqto'a
 The History of Yuan by Song Lian
 The History of Ming by Zhang Tingyu
 The Draft History of Qing by Zhao Erxun is usually referred as the 25th classic of history records
 The New History of Yuan by Ke Shaomin is sometimes referred as the 26th classic of history records
 The Chronicles of Huayang, an old record of ancient history and tales of southwestern China, attributed to Chang Qu.
The Biographies of Exemplary Women, a biographical collection of exemplary women in ancient China, compiled by Liu Xiang.
 The Spring and Autumn Annals of the Sixteen Kingdoms, a historical record of the Sixteen Kingdoms, attributed to Cui Hong, is lost.
 The Shiming, is a dictionary compiled by Liu Xi by the end of 2nd century.
 A New Account of the Tales of the World, a collection of historical anecdotes and character sketches of some 600 literati, musicians, and painters.
 The Thirty-Six Strategies, a military strategy book attributed to Tan Daoji.
The Literary Mind and the Carving of Dragons (Wen Xin Diao Long), a review book on ancient Chinese literature and writings by Liu Xie.
 The Commentary on the Water Classic, a book on hydrology of rivers in China attributed to the great geographer Li Daoyuan.
 The Dialogues between Li Jing and Tang Taizong, a military strategy book attributed to Li Jing
 The Comprehensive Mirror for Aid in Government (Zizhi Tongjian), with Sima Guang as its main editor.
 The Spring and Autumn Annals of Wu and Yue, a historical record of the states of Wu and Yue during the Spring and Autumn period, attributed to Zhao Ye.
 The Zhenguan Zhengyao, a record of governance strategies and leadership of Emperor Taizong of Tang, attributed to Wu Jing.
 Da Dai Li Ji by Dai de a commentary/edition of the book of rites though less popular then Dai sheng's version 
 Xiao Dai Li Ji or just jiji a commentary/edition of the book of rites by Dai Sheng it is relatively the book of rites along with Dai de's da Dai li ji it makes up the commentaries by the dai's or translated tai in some instances 
 The Jiaoshi Yilin, a work modelled after the I Ching, composed during the Western Han dynasty and attributed to Jiao Yanshou.
 The Nine Chapters on the Mathematical Art, a mathematics Chinese book composed by several generations scholars of Han dynasty.
 The Thousand Character Classic, attributed to Zhou Xingsi.
 The Treatise on Astrology of the Kaiyuan Era, compiled by Gautama Siddha, is a Chinese encyclopedia on astrology and divination.
 The Shitong, written by Liu Zhiji, a work on historiography.
 The Tongdian, written by Du You, a contemporary text focused on the Tang dynasty.
 The Tang Huiyao, compiled by Wang Pu, a text based on the institutional history of the Tang dynasty.
 The Great Tang Records on the Western Regions, compiled by Bianji; a recount of Xuanzang's journey.
 The Miscellaneous Morsels from Youyang, written by Duan Chengshi, records fantastic stories, anecdotes, and exotic customs.
 The Four Great Books of Song, a term referring to the four large compilations during the beginning of Song dynasty:
 The Taiping Yulan, a leishu encyclopedia.
 The Taiping Guangji , a collection of folk tales and theology.
 The Wenyuan Yinghua, an anthology of poetry, odes, songs and other writings.
 The Cefu Yuangui, a leishu encyclopedia of political essays, autobiographies, memorials and decrees.
 The Dream Pool Essay, a collection of essays on science, technology, military strategies, history, politics, music and arts, written by Shen Kuo.
 The Exploitation of the Works of Nature, an encyclopedia compiled by Song Yingxing.
 The Compendium of Materia Medica, a classic book of medicine written by Li Shizhen.
 The Siku Quanshu, the largest compilation of literature in Chinese history.
 The New Songs from the Jade Terrace, a poetry collection from the Six Dynasties period.
 The Quan Tangshi, or Collected Tang Poems, compiled during the Qing dynasty, published AD 1705.
 The Xiaolin Guangji, a collection of jokes compiled during the Qing dynasty.

See also
Chinese literature
Imperial examination
List of early Chinese texts
Kaicheng Stone Classics
Seven Military Classics
Old Texts
Sinology
Thomas Francis Wade
Herbert Giles
Lionel Giles
Frederic H. Balfour

References

Citations

Sources 
 Primary sources

 
 

 Other sources

 
 
 
 
 
 
 
 
 
 
 
 
 
 
 
 
 
 
 
 
 
 
 
 
 
 
 
 
 
 
 
 
 
 
 
 
 
 
 
 
 
 
 
 
 
 
 
 
 
 
 
 
 
 
 
 
 
 
 
 
 
 
 
 
 
 
 
 
 
 
 
  Online
 
 
 Endymion Wilkinson. Chinese History: A New Manual. (Cambridge, Massachusetts: Harvard University Asia Center, Harvard-Yenching Institute Monograph Series. New Edition; Second, Revised printing March 2013).  . See esp. pp. 365– 377, Ch. 28, "The Confucian Classics."

External links 

 Chinese Text Project (English Chinese) (Chinese philosophy texts in classical Chinese with English and modern Chinese translations)
The Canonical Books of Confucianism, David K. Jordan
Relevant Electronic Resources for Chinese Classical Studies

 in Traditional Chinese
 Scripta Sinica Big classic texts database by Academia Sinica
 Palace Museum Chinese Text Database
 中國電子古籍世界 Classics database
 Research Center for Chinese Ancient Texts includes CHANT (CHinese ANcient Texts) Database
 Chinese classic text online

 in Simplified Chinese
 凌云小筑 In Chinese, with articles and discussions on literature, history, and philosophy.
 国学导航

 in Japanese
 東方學デジタル圖書館

 
 
Chinese philosophy
Series of Chinese books